Geoffrey Derrick Wright (1 March 1930 – 2011) was an English professional footballer who played as an inside forward in the Football League for Walsall. He was on the books of Sheffield Wednesday, Aston Villa and Bournemouth & Boscombe Athletic without playing league football for any of them, and also appeared for Rugby Town, Nuneaton Borough and Hinckley Athletic.

His father, Steve Wright, played league football for Bolton Wanderers, Norwich City and Brighton & Hove Albion in the 1920s. Wright died in Leicester in 2011, at the age of 81.

References

1930 births
2011 deaths
People from Countesthorpe
Footballers from Leicestershire
English footballers
Association football inside forwards
Sheffield Wednesday F.C. players
Aston Villa F.C. players
AFC Bournemouth players
Rugby Town F.C. (1945) players
Walsall F.C. players
Nuneaton Borough F.C. players
Hinckley Athletic F.C. players
English Football League players